The 1984–85 Yugoslav Second League season was the 39th season of the Second Federal League, the second level association football competition of SFR Yugoslavia, since its establishment in 1946. The league was contested in two regional groups (West Division and East Division), with 18 clubs each.

West Division

Teams
A total of eighteen teams contested the league, including twelve sides from the 1983–84 season, two clubs relegated from the 1983–84 Yugoslav First League and four sides promoted from the Inter-Republic Leagues played in the 1983–84 season. The league was contested in a double round robin format, with each club playing every other club twice, for a total of 34 rounds. Two points were awarded for wins and one point for draws.

Čelik Zenica and Olimpija Ljubljana were relegated from the 1983–84 Yugoslav First League after finishing at the bottom two places of the league table. The four clubs promoted to the second level were Crvenka, Maribor, Rudar Ljubija and RNK Split.

League table

East Division

Teams
A total of eighteen teams contested the league, including fourteen sides from the 1983–84 season and four sides promoted from the Inter-Republic Leagues played in the 1983–84 season. The league was contested in a double round robin format, with each club playing every other club twice, for a total of 34 rounds. Two points were awarded for wins and one point for draws.

There were no teams relegated from the 1983–84 Yugoslav First League and four clubs promoted to the second level were Bregalnica Štip, Liria, Novi Pazar and OFK Titograd.

League table

See also
1984–85 Yugoslav First League
1984–85 Yugoslav Cup

References
General

Yugoslav Second League seasons
Yugo
2